Freedom Park is an informal housing settlement situated near the town of Rustenburg in North West Province, South Africa. It was established in the 1980s when poor people from other parts of South Africa were attracted by the possibility of employment at the nearby Impala Platinum mine. Today the settlement has a population of approximately 25,000 people. There is little public infrastructure at Freedom Park and residents lack adequate access to sanitation, electricity, and portable water.

References

Populated places in the Rustenburg Local Municipality
Shanty towns in South Africa
Rustenburg